The 1941 The Citadel Bulldogs football team was an American football team that represented The Citadel, The Military College of South Carolina as a member of the Southern Conference during the 1941 college football season.  In their second season under head coach Bo Rowland, the Bulldogs compiled a 4–3–1 record (0–2–1 against conference opponents), finished 14th in the conference, and outscored opponents by a total of 175 to 89. The Bulldogs played home games at Johnson Hagood Stadium.

Schedule

References

Citadel Bulldogs
The Citadel Bulldogs football seasons
Citadel football